Potassium niobate (KNbO3) is an inorganic compound with the formula KNbO3.  A colorless solid, it is classified as a  perovskite ferroelectric material. It exhibits nonlinear optical properties, and is a component of some lasers. Nanowires of potassium niobate have been used to produce tunable coherent light.

Structure
On cooling from high temperature, KNbO3 undergoes a series of structural phase transitions. At 435 °C, the crystal symmetry changes from cubic centrosymmetric (Pmm) to tetragonal non-centrosymmetric (P4mm). On further cooling, at 225 °C the crystal symmetry changes from tetragonal (P4mm) to orthorhombic (Amm2) and at −50 °C from orthorhombic (Amm2) to rhombohedral (R3m).

Applications and research
In addition to research in electronic memory storage, potassium niobate is used in resonant doubling. This technique allows small infrared lasers to convert output into blue light, a critical technology for the production of blue lasers and technology dependent upon them.

Potassium niobate has been found useful in many different areas of materials science, including properties of lasers, quantum teleportation,
and it has been used to study the optical properties of particulate composite materials.

Safety
The  for potassium niobate is 3000 mg/kg (oral, rat).

References

Potassium compounds
Niobates
Nonlinear optical materials
Ferroelectric materials
Perovskites
Piezoelectric materials